Abapura is a village panchayat located in the Banswara district of the Indian state of Rajasthan. It belongs to Udaipur Division.

Geography 
It is located 14 km south of District headquarters Banswara and 16 km from Banswara.

Transport 
The nearest railway station to Abapura is Bhairongarh which is located in and around 41.9 kilometer distance. Ratlam Jn Rail Way Station is a major station 60 km away.

Villages in Banswara district